The 2000 Arkansas Razorbacks football team represented the University of Arkansas in the 2000 NCAA Division I-A football season. It marked the Razorbacks' 108th overall season and their 8th as a member of the Southeastern Conference (SEC). The team is led by head coach Houston Nutt, in his third year, and played its home games at both Razorback Stadium in Fayetteville and War Memorial Stadium in Little Rock, Arkansas. They finished the season with a record of six wins and six losses (6–6 overall, 3–5 in the SEC) and with a loss against UNLV in the Las Vegas Bowl.

Schedule

Source:

Roster

References

Arkansas
Arkansas Razorbacks football seasons
Arkansas Razorbacks football